Axiology (from Greek , axia: "value, worth"; and , -logia: "study of") is the philosophical study of value.  It includes questions about the nature and classification of values and about what kinds of things have value. It is intimately connected with various other philosophical fields that crucially depend on the notion of value, like ethics, aesthetics or philosophy of religion. It is also closely related to value theory and meta-ethics. The term was first used by Paul Lapie, in 1902, and Eduard von Hartmann, in 1908.

The distinction between intrinsic and extrinsic value is central to axiology. One conceptualization holds that something is intrinsically valuable if it is good in itself or good for its own sake. It is usually held that intrinsic value depends on certain features of the valuable entity. For example, an experience may be said to be intrinsically valuable by virtue of being (because it is) pleasurable or beautiful or "true" (e.g., the ascertainment of a fact can be said to be valuable in itself). Extrinsic value, by contrast, is ascribed to things that are valuable only as a means to something else. Substantive theories of value try to determine which entities have intrinsic value. Monist theories hold that there is only one type of intrinsic value. The paradigm example of monist theories is hedonism, the thesis that only pleasure has intrinsic value. Pluralist theories, on the other hand, contend that there are various different types of intrinsic value, for example, virtue, knowledge, friendship, etc. Value pluralists face the problem of explaining whether or how the different types of value can be compared when making rational decisions. Some philosophers state that values do not exist on the most fundamental level of reality. One such view holds that a value statement about something just expresses the speaker's approval or disapproval of this thing. This position is opposed by realists about value.

History

Between the 5th and 6th centuries BC, it was important in Greece to be knowledgeable if you were to be successful. Philosophers began to recognize that differences existed between the laws and morality of society. Socrates believed that knowledge had a vital connection to virtue, making morality and democracy closely intertwined. Socrates' student, Plato furthered the belief by establishing virtues which should be followed by all.

E. J. Dijksterhuis found that axiological antithesis characterized the philosophy of ancient Greece:

As with the fall of Rome so values became more individual and personal, causing skeptic skeptic/schools of thought to flourish, helping to shape an ontologically objective philosophy that is thought to have contributed to Christian Philosophy. During the medieval period, Thomas Aquinas made the distinction between natural and supernatural (theological) virtues. This concept led philosophers to distinguish between judgments based on fact and judgments based on values, creating the division between science and philosophy.

Intrinsic value 
Traditionally, philosophers held that an entity has intrinsic value if it is good in itself or good for its own sake. Intrinsic value is contrasted with extrinsic or instrumental value, which is ascribed to things that are valuable only as a means to something else. For example, tools like cars or microwaves are said to be extrinsically valuable by virtue of the function they perform, while the well-being they cause is intrinsically valuable, according to hedonism. The same entity can be valuable in different ways: some entities have both intrinsic and extrinsic values at the same time. Extrinsic values can form chains, in which one entity is extrinsically valuable because it is a means to another entity that is itself extrinsically valuable. It is commonly held that these chains must terminate somewhere and that the endpoint can only be intrinsically valuable. The distinction between intrinsic and extrinsic values is important for understanding various disagreements within axiology. Different substantive theories of value often agree on whether something, for example knowledge, is valuable while disagreeing on whether the value in question is intrinsic or extrinsic.

The traditional conception of intrinsic value presented above has been criticized in contemporary philosophy on the grounds that it combines various distinct notions that are better discussed separately. One such contrast is between intrinsic and final values. On a more narrow conception, an intrinsic value is a value an entity has in virtue of its intrinsic properties. For example, assuming that the phenomenal aspect of a pleasant experience is an intrinsic property, we might say that the experience is intrinsically valuable because of this intrinsic property. An entity with final value, by contrast, is valuable for its own sake. It is usually accepted that there is a conceptual difference between intrinsic and final values. For example, the pleasure experience may be said to be intrinsically valuable on the one hand, and finally valuable on the other hand. But it has been disputed whether there are actual things where these value types can come apart. Proposed candidates for bearers of final non-intrinsic value include unique or rare items (e.g. a stamp) or historically significant items (e.g. the pen that Abraham Lincoln used to sign the Emancipation Proclamation). Being-rare and having-been-used-by-someone are extrinsic properties that may be responsible for their bearers having final value, i.e. being valuable for their own sake.

Some philosophers have questioned whether extrinsic values should be regarded as values at all rather than as mere indications of values. One reason for considering this idea is that adding or removing extrinsically valuable things does not affect the value of the whole if all intrinsically valuable things are kept constant. For example, the 2011 Tōhoku earthquake had a negative extrinsic value because of all the damage it caused. But arguably, the world would not have been a better place if exactly the same damage had been caused without the earthquake.

Ontological status of values 
In axiology, it is often important to distinguish between the entity that is valuable and the features in virtue of which it is valuable. For example, an experience may be said to be valuable in virtue of being pleasurable. This distinction is particularly relevant for intrinsic values since it is commonly held that the intrinsic value of an entity supervenes on its intrinsic features. This means that the entity could not have a different intrinsic value unless it had different intrinsic features.

Substantive theories of value focus on the features in virtue of which something has intrinsic value. Popular candidates for these features include pleasure, virtue and knowledge. Another question concerns the nature of the entities that are the bearers of value. The main approaches to this question can be divided into the Kantian tradition, which considers concrete things like persons to be the bearers of value, and the Moorean tradition, which holds that only states of affairs bear value. This difference is important when determining whether a value is extrinsic or intrinsic to an entity. Some philosophers hold that objects like Napoleon's hat are valuable because of their relation to extraordinary persons. From a Kantian perspective, this value must be extrinsic since it is based on the extrinsic property of having been worn by an extraordinary person. But from a Moorean perspective, it can be intrinsic since it is born not by the hat but by a state of affairs involving both the hat and Napoleon.

The preceding discussion about the ontological categories of values and value-bearers assumes some form of realism: that there actually are valuable things. But the difficulties in reaching expert consensus in value-related fields like ethics, aesthetics or politics and considerations from naturalism have led various philosophers to doubt this assumption. The ensuing dispute between cognitivists and non-cognitivists is usually held on the level of value-statements or value-attitudes, either concerning all values or specifically concerning ethical values. Cognitivists assert that value-statements are truth-apt, i.e. are either true or false, which is denied by non-cognitivists. Most cognitivists are realists about values: they believe that values are part of reality. Error theory, as originally articulated by J. L. Mackie, is an exception. Error theorists hold that all value-statements are false, and thereby truth-apt, because the world lacks value-features that would be needed to make them true. Non-cognitivists, on the other hand, go one step further by denying that value-statements are truth-apt. This position involves the difficulty of explaining how value-statements can be meaningful despite lacking a truth value. This challenge can be met in different ways. Emotivists, following A. J. Ayer, state that value-statements only express the emotions of the speaker and are intended to influence the actions of the listener. Prescriptivism, as developed by R. M. Hare, interprets value-statements as imperatives or commands. Simon Blackburn's quasi-realism states that value statements project emotional attitudes as though they were real properties.

Monism and pluralism 
Substantive theories of value try to determine which entities have intrinsic value. A traditional dispute in this field is between monist and pluralist theories. According to Chris Heathwood, monism and pluralism can be distinguished according to an evaluation of what is good in people and the concept of "value simpliciter" in terms of intrinsic value. 

Monist theories hold that there is only one type of intrinsic value. The paradigm example of monist theories is hedonism, the thesis that only pleasure has intrinsic value. Pluralist theories, on the other hand, contend that there are various different types of intrinsic value.  They maintain that these types of intrinsic values cannot be reduced to a single feature of an act or entity. W. D. Ross, for example, holds that pleasure is only one type of intrinsic value besides other types, like knowledge. It is important to keep in mind that this disagreement only concerns intrinsic value, not value at large. So hedonists may be happy to concede that knowledge is valuable, but only extrinsically so, given that knowledge can be helpful in causing pleasure and avoiding pain.

Various arguments have been suggested in the monism-pluralism-dispute. Common-sense seems to favor value pluralism: values are ascribed to a wide range of different things like happiness, liberty, friendship, etc. without any obvious common feature underlying these values. One way to defend value monism is to cast doubt on the reliability of common-sense for technical matters like the distinction between intrinsic and extrinsic value. This strategy is pursued by J. J. C. Smart, who holds that there is a psychological bias to mistake stable extrinsic values for intrinsic values. Value pluralists have often attempted to provide exhaustive lists of all value types, but different theorists have suggested very different lists. These lists seem to constitute arbitrary selections unless a clear criterion could be provided why all and only these items are included. But if a criterion was to be found then such a theory would no longer be pluralistic. This dilemma suggests that pluralism is inadequate as an explanation.

One issue closely related to the monism-pluralism-debate is the problem of incommensurability: the question of whether there are incommensurable values. Two values are incommensurable if there is no fact as to whether one is better than or as good as the other: there is no common value scale according to which they could be compared. According to Joseph Raz, career choices between very different paths, for example, whether to become a lawyer or a clarinetist, are cases where incommensurable values are involved. Value pluralists often assert that values belonging to different types are incommensurable with each other. Value monists, by contrast, usually deny that there are incommensurable values. This question is particularly relevant for ethics. If different options available to the agent embody incommensurable values then there seems to be no rational way to determine what ought to be done since there is no matter of fact as to which option is better. Widespread incommensurability would threaten to undermine the practical relevance of ethics and rational choice.

Other concepts and distinctions 
Many evaluative terms are found in everyday language, often with various different meanings. It is important for philosophers to distinguish these different meanings in order to avoid misunderstandings. One such distinction is between a predicative and an attributive sense of good and bad. In the attributive sense, an entity is good in relation to a certain kind. For example, a person with a clear voice may be a good singer or a knife with a blunt edge may be a bad knife. But this still leaves it open whether the entity in question is good or bad in an unqualified or predicative sense. For example, a person may be a bad assassin but being bad as an assassin is not bad in a predicative sense. Axiology is usually interested in the predicative sense of goodness. But some philosophers deny that such a sense exists and therefore hold that all value is relative to a kind.

A second important distinction is that between being good for a person and being good for the world. Being good for a person or prudential value has to do with this person's welfare or well-being. But what is good for one person may be bad for another person. For example, having a dry summer may be good for the hiker in virtue of the pleasant hiking conditions, but bad for the farmer, whose crop is dying because of a lack of water. In such cases, the question arises as to what is good for the world or good simpliciter. Utilitarians can solve this problem by defining the good for the world as the sum of the good for each persons.

Philosophers often distinguish between evaluative concepts (like good or bad) and deontic concepts (like right, fitting or ought). The former belong to axiology proper and express what has worth or value while the latter belong to ethics (and related fields) and express what one ought to do. Philosophers have tried to provide a unified account of these two fields since they seem to be intimately related. Consequentialists see evaluative concepts as fundamental and define deontic concepts in terms of evaluative concepts. Fitting-attitude theories, on the other hand, try to reduce evaluative concepts to deontic concepts. Consequentialism is an ethical theory that holds that, given a certain set of possible actions, we ought to perform the action that has the best overall consequences. So what we ought to do is defined in evaluative terms: whatever leads to the consequences with the highest value. Fitting-attitude theories are axiological theories that define the value of something in terms of the attitude that would be fitting to have towards this thing, for example, that it would be good to find a cure for cancer because this would be a fitting object of desire. These accounts build on the deontic notion that some of our attitudes towards the world are fitting or right to define what is good.

See also

References

Further reading
  384 pages.
  100 pages.
  140 pages.
 Marías, Julián (1967). History of Philosophy. New York: Dover Publications, Inc.

External links

 
 Cultura: International Journal of Philosophy of Culture and Axiology
 Axiology.org.uk
 Axiology at PhilPapers

 
Concepts in aesthetics
Concepts in ethics
Concepts in metaphysics
Critical thinking
Ethics
Meta-ethics
Metaphilosophy